It's Just a Matter of Time may refer to:

 It's Just a Matter of Time (album), a 1985 album by Glen Campbell
 "It's Just a Matter of Time" (song), a song by Brook Benton, also covered by Sonny James, Glen Campbell and Randy Travis
 "It's Just a Matter of Time", a song by The Beach Boys from The Beach Boys
 "It's Just a Matter of Time", a song by Liza Minnelli from Liza! Liza!
 "It's Just a Matter of Time", a song by Peabo Bryson from Peabo
 "It's Just a Matter of Time", a song from the musical Ace

See also 
 Just a Matter of Time (disambiguation)
 A Matter of Time (disambiguation)